Svenska Cupen 1949 was the ninth season of the main Swedish football Cup. The competition was concluded on 24 July 1949 with the Final, held at Råsunda Stadium, Solna in Stockholms län. AIK won 1-0 against Landskrona BoIS before an attendance of 14,718 spectators.

Preliminary round
For results see SFS-Bolletinen - Matcher i Svenska Cupen.

First round

For other results see SFS-Bolletinen - Matcher i Svenska Cupen.

Second round
The 8 matches in this round were played between 3 July 1949.

Quarter-finals
The 4 matches in this round were played on 10 July 1949 and a replay on 15 July 1949.

Semi-finals
The semi-finals in this round were played on 17 July 1949.

Final
The final was played on 24 July 1949 at the Råsunda Stadium.

Footnotes

References 

1949
Cup
Sweden